Eman is a village in the Uruan local government area of Akwa Ibom State, Nigeria. The Ibibio people are occupants of the Eman village.

References

Villages in Akwa Ibom